Stanisław Grzmot-Skotnicki (13 January 1894 – 19 September 1939) was a Polish military commander and a general of the Polish Army. During the invasion of Poland of 1939 he commanded the Czersk Operational Group and was among the highest ranking Polish officers to be killed in action in that war.

Stanisław Skotnicki was born on 13 January 1894 in the village of Skotniki (being the root of his surname which literally means lord of Skotniki), to a family of Polish nobility (bearing the coat-of-arms of Clan Bogoria of which the lords of Skotniki are among the most ancient and prominent branches). After graduating from a gymnasium in Radom, he was sent to a Trade Academy in Sankt Gallen in Switzerland. There he formed a unit of the Związek Strzelecki and started organizing military training for the Polish emigrees and students. It was then he adopted his nom de guerre of Grzmot (Polish language for thunder), which later formed a part of his surname. Upon the outbreak of the Great War he returned to Poland, to Austro-Hungarian Galicia, where he volunteered for the service in the Polish Legions. In August 1914 he became the member of The Seven Lancers of Belina under Władysław Belina-Prażmowski, the first detachment of the Polish Cavalry to cross the border with Privislinsky Krai. Later in the war he served in the cavalry regiment of the Legions, in which he commanded a platoon and then a squadron. After the Oath Crisis of 1917 he was interned in a camp in Beniaminów.

After Poland regained her independence in November 1918 Stanisław Grzmot-Skotnicki took part in re-creation of his cavalry regiment, which later adopted the name of 1st Regiment of Light Cavalry of Józef Piłsudski (1. pułk szwoleżerów im. marszałka Józefa Piłsudskiego). As one of its commanders he took part in the Polish-Ukrainian War, after which he was sent to the newly created School of Cavalry Officers in Warsaw, and then to the Application School of Cavalry in Saumur in France.

Upon his return, in August 1920 he became the commanding officer of the 8th Cavalry Brigade and then the entire 2nd Cavalry Division on the fronts of the Polish-Soviet War. After the war he became the head instructor at the Centre for Cavalry Training in Grudziądz. Between 1924 and 1927 he was the commander of the prestigious Poznań-based 15th Uhlan Regiment. Since 1927 he commanded the 9th Independent Cavalry Brigade. After the reorganization of Polish Cavalry in 1932 he commanded the Baranowicze cavalry brigade of the Border Defence Corps and then the Nowogródek Cavalry Brigade. Since 1937 he served as the commander of the Pomeranian Cavalry Brigade.

At the start of the invasion of Poland in 1939, he commanded his unit as the core of the Czersk Operational Group which was to shield the Vistula river crossings against the German offensive and to protect the flanks of the Pomorze Army. After that unit's defeat in the battle of Tuchola Forest, he withdrew with the remnants of his unit to the south. During the Battle of the Bzura River he commanded a small improvised infantry unit, with which he headed for Warsaw after the Polish defeat in the battle. On 18 September 1939, he was heavily wounded in the village of Tułowice and died of wounds the following day. Initially buried on the spot, in 1952 his body was exhumed and moved to Warsaw's Powązki Military Cemetery.

Awards 
 Virtuti Militari, Golden Cross; previously awarded the Silver Cross
 Polonia Restituta, Commander's Cross; previously awarded the Officer's Cross
 Cross of Independence
 Cross of Merit, Golden)
 Cross of Valour 4x times
 Légion d'honneur, Commander's Cross (France); previously awarded the Knight's Cross
 Order of the Cross of the Eagle, Class II (Estonia, 1936)

References 

1894 births
1939 deaths
People from Sandomierz County
People from Radom Governorate
Clan of Bogoria
Polish generals
Polish legionnaires (World War I)
Polish people of the Polish–Ukrainian War
Polish people of the Polish–Soviet War
People of the Polish May Coup (pro-government side)
Polish military personnel killed in World War II
Recipients of the Gold Cross of the Virtuti Militari
Commandeurs of the Légion d'honneur
Commanders of the Order of Polonia Restituta
Recipients of the Cross of Independence
Recipients of the Gold Cross of Merit (Poland)
Recipients of the Cross of Valour (Poland)
Recipients of the Military Order of the Cross of the Eagle, Class II
Burials at Powązki Military Cemetery